Holtet may refer to:

Places
Norway
 Holtet, Østfold, a village in Halden municipality, Østfold county
 Holtet, Oslo, a village in Oslo municipality
Holtet (station), a rail station in Oslo
 Holtet, Troms, a village in Harstad municipality, Troms county

Other
 Holtet Nunatak, a nunatak in Palmer Land, Antarctica

People
Holtet (surname), a Danish family surname
Marius Holtet, a Norwegian professional ice hockey forward

sv:Vassbotten/Holtet